Eliticide or elitocide refers to "the killing of the leadership, the educated, and the clergy of a group." It is usually carried out during the beginning of a genocide in order to cripple a possible resistance movement against its perpetrators. Examples of eliticide include the Armenian genocide, the Isaaq genocide, the Cambodian genocide, the German–Soviet occupation of Poland, Bolshevik Red Terror in Russia and instances of eliticide during the Yugoslav Wars. The term was first used in 1992 by British reporter Michael Nicholson to describe the Bijeljina massacre in Bosnia and Herzegovina. During the Bosnian War, local Serbs would point out prominent Bosniaks to be killed afterwards by Serb soldiers.

Eliticide is also carried out in cases of political revolutions supported by the people and targeted against the elites of the overthrown establishment, rather than being unpopular and indiscriminatory, as in the above cases of genocide. For example, during the French Revolution, the people executed members of the feudal Ancien Régime, made famous through the public use of the guillotine. Another example occurred in Italy, where the partisans executed Mussolini after the defeat of his regime at the end of World War II in Europe.

See also

 Bibliography of Genocide studies
 Classicide
 Katyn massacre

Notes

References
 
 
 
 

Genocide